William Thomas Murphy (August 7, 1899 – January 29, 1978) of Chicago was a U.S. Representative from the 3rd congressional district of Illinois During his time in office, from 1959 to 1971, Murphy's district saw cultural and economic shifts with frequent civil rights marches and the closure of steel mills In the south of Chicago. In 1960 black minority residents made up just 20% of the population, but exceeded 40% by decade end.

Congressman Murphy joined civil rights leader Martin Luther King Jr in active support of open housing, culminating in passage of the 1968 Fair Housing Act.

He was a graduate of Loyola University Chicago. He was a Democrat. Moreover, Murphy served in the First World War and was a Chicago Alderman.

William Thomas Murphy died of cancer at Chicago's Oak Park hospital. He was 78.

References

External links

1899 births
1978 deaths
Chicago City Council members
American military personnel of World War I
United States Army soldiers
Democratic Party members of the United States House of Representatives from Illinois
20th-century American politicians